Lego Racers 2 is a Lego-themed racing video game developed by Attention to Detail, published by Lego Software and distributed in North America by Electronic Arts. It was first released in September 2001 for Microsoft Windows, PlayStation 2 and Game Boy Advance. It is the sequel to the 1999 game Lego Racers. This sequel was first revealed by Lego Software on August 20, 2001.

Gameplay
Unlike the original Lego Racers, the player has more "freedom", because the player can race or drive freely, and there are other characters that the player can talk to. Lego Racers 2 also has, like in the original, a car and characters designer. It has more bricks but fewer characters to make and edit. In Lego Racers 2, up to 11 opponents can be chosen. In any race, the racers have to drive through a set of checkpoints each lap in the correct order. There are four different weapons that can be used to damage the opponents’ cars, as well as an invisibility shield. The player gets these weapons and the shield by collecting bubbles which randomly assign the player an item, assuming the player doesn't have one already. On each track there is a pair of pink fences which any racer can drive in-between to repair their car, partially or completely depending on the amount of damage and how much time is spent there. If a vehicle gets destroyed, the character is forced to run slowly on foot until the character enters a repair station and gains back their vehicle.

Plot

The main mode of the game is a single-player open-world adventure game featuring a galaxy of five worlds: Sandy Bay, Dino Island, Mars, the Arctic, and Xalax. Sandy Bay is a green landscape featuring two beaches and a small town. Dino Island is a jungle island featuring a large continuous area of grass and trees in the middle and a lava building featuring circular spiral that leads to an exit at the top. Mars is the planet Mars. The Arctic is a cold, snowy and icy world and Xalax is a large circular arena featuring an open blue world in the middle and, around it, a cyan-colored circular track and a large ecstatic crowd. Except for Sandy Bay, each world contains four races against five casual AI drivers from that world, a final boss race and a lobby connecting all five races. Each world also contains one or two bonus games. When entering any world for the first time, the player builds his own car or chooses between Sparky's pre-built cars for that world. The player then drives around each world using their car for that world to access and enter all activities. To gain access to new worlds, the player must collect golden bricks by winning non-boss races and finding hidden golden bricks in each world. Each non-boss race has three laps while each boss race has two laps (the final race has three). The game features a player assistant named Sparky, who guides, advises and supports the player and allows the player to save the game and explore each world to find golden bricks and bonus games. By beating bosses and winning bonus games, the player collects car power-ups that make their car faster, more stable on the ground or more resistant to taking damage. Dino Island's boss is Sam Sanister, a reincarnation of Baron von Barron from Lego Adventurers, who has a fast car and lays oil on the ground that causes the player to slip out of control. The Mars boss is Riegel's large self-built walking robot which is indestructible and is unaffected by attacks and the Arctic boss is The Berg, a gorilla-looking ice creature who runs and is also indestructible and unaffected by attacks and lays ice ridges on the ground that send the player's car into the air and slow it down. The Berg gets a head start.

The player builds his Lego character and starts in the middle of Sandy Bay, the main world, which features take-off points to travel to each of the other worlds, provided that the player has collected enough golden bricks for that world. The player drives down to the nearby beach and meets Sparky who asks the player to go back to town. When the player arrives, they join a circle of four other drivers from that world – Workman Fred, Mike the Postman, Fireman Gavin, and Police Chief Bobby – who have a heated discussion about who is the fastest racer on Sandy Bay. Each of the four challengers insists that they are the fastest driver. Fred is repeatedly laughed at by the remaining four drivers when the idea of a digger ever winning a race is ridiculed by Gavin and the player. Fred asks the player to come to his construction site to race him, confident of winning to the point of awarding the player a golden brick if he loses. After beating him, the player goes to and races Mike, then after defeating him, they race Gavin, and finally Bobby. After defeating all four challengers on Sandy Bay, the player heads off to Dino Island to win the four pre-boss races and then beat the boss there, Sam Sanister. The player then completes the races at Mars and Arctic. 

The player then enters the portal leading to the fifth and final world, Xalax. After winning the four races in the open world, the player takes on Rocket Racer – the reigning galactic racing champion who has the fastest car in the galaxy – on the cyan oval track. When the player wins the race, the player's character walks up the stairs of a tall small construction in the middle of the arena and receives the championship trophy from Rocket Racer and shows it off to the crowd. The character then goes back down and is surrounded by Sparky, the four challengers from Sandy Bay and the three other bosses who celebrate and praise the new galactic racing champion. The final race is then re-played automatically. When the player also has collected all 35 golden bricks, the player can observe fireworks in the sky in the middle of Sandy Bay.

Reception
Lego Racers 2 was rated average to positive. The PC version was given a score of 7.8 out of 10 by IGN; the reviewer praised its graphics and gameplay, but criticized the voice and talk which were derided as "cartoon gibberish". IGN rated the PS2 version only 6 out of 10, which corresponding graphics and gameplay were inferior to its PC counterpart. An additional note is that a copy cost $20 for PC, but $40 for PS2; the reviewer thought the latter to be poor value for money, while the PC version, at half the cost, was acceptable.

Sequel 

Electronic Arts, which signed a contract with Lego Software (formerly Lego Media, later renamed to Lego Interactive) to co-published their titles in December 2001, revealed their line-up for E3 2002, again held in May, which firstly covered Drome Racers (known in development as Lego Racers 3), a successor to the Lego Racers series, again developed by Attention to Detail. Microsoft Windows and PlayStation 2 versions of the game were shown at E3 and ECTS. The game did not pick up the story of either of the two predecessors, and focused more heavily on tracks based around Lego Technic sets, rather than various themes. The game was released in November 2002, but to lesser acclaim. The game was panned by critics who thought that the game was lacking features that were essential to the first two games, such as building your own driver and vehicle from Lego bricks, though others considered Drome Racers to be its own title outside the Lego Racers, and present a solid gameplay and visual appeal individually. Attention to Detail went into liquidation on August 28, 2003, just shortly before the release of Drome Racers port to GameCube.

References

2001 video games
Attention to Detail games
Game Boy Advance games
Kart racing video games
Racers 2
Multiplayer and single-player video games
PlayStation 2 games
Pocket Studios games
Racing video games
Video game sequels
Video games developed in the United Kingdom
Windows games